Peter of Siena (died 1321) was a 14th-century Franciscan missionary and martyr. He is reverenced in the Latin Church in India as one of the FourMartyrsofThane, on April 9.

Life
In 1320, Peter left Hormuz with his fellow Franciscans James of Padua and Thomas of Tolentino, the Dominican Jordan of Severac, and the layman Demetrio da Tifliz. A Georgian or Armenian, Demetrius was proficient at languages and served as the group's interpreter. A storm forced the party to land at Thane on  Salsette Island near Mumbai in India en route, and they were greeted by local Nestorians. Jordan left them to preach at Bharuch, reaching Sopara (see Sopara in history) before he heard Demetrius and the Franciscans had been arrested. The family with whom they were staying had fallen into a quarrel and the husband had beaten his wife. When she went to the qadi to report this abuse, she had mentioned the four clerics as witnesses and they were called before him. Thomas, James, and Demetrius had gone to the court while Peter remained behind to look after their things. Having begun a discussion of religion, the qadi had asked them their opinion of Muhammad and Thomas replied bluntly that he was "the son of perdition and had his place in Hell with the Devil his father". At this, the Muslims around the court called for their death for blasphemy. Some accounts claim they were scourged and tortured before their execution by beheading on April 8, 1321. Peter was killed three days later.

Notes

References

Franciscan beatified people
Italian beatified people
14th-century Italian people
People from Siena
1321 deaths